Sarmatova Garden (Russian: Сад Сарматовой) was a place of cultural rest for the citizens in Taganrog, which was created in the first quarter of the 20th century.  The founder of the summer garden was Madame A. S. Sarmatova.  It was located in the Italyansky lane.

History 
Between the corner house located along the Greek street and the house number 3 in the Italyansky lane of Taganrog, there was a summer garden. It has been one of the places of cultural rest for the inhabitants of the city for decades. It was founded in the first quarter of the 20th century by the former dancer and singer A.S. Sarmatova. On Leninskaya Street across the sidewalk was a sign with the inscription "Sarmatova's Garden".

Initially, in this location, Madame Sarmatova opened a small theater. It is a small area consisting of two terraces. The foreigners, local officers and lawyers came to view the entertainment in the summer garden of Sarmatova. The garden featured a cafe named "Buff", which sold  ice cream, mors, beer, kvass, seltzer water, and soft drinks. Variety performances started at ten in the evening and the cafe was open until two in the morning.

For a time the Civil war caused the garden to close, but it reopened. At one point, Sarmatova's garden was sponsored by the Committee for the Management of Public Education. Then it was headed by the art section of the Political Enlightenment and then the summer garden became a branch of the Taganrog Drama Theater. Klavdiya Shulzhenko, Vadim Kozin, Vladimir Koralli, Isabella Yurieva, as well as Yakov Skomarovsky's pop orchestra performed here during the era of the Soviet Union.

In the late 1930s, the stage in the Sarmatova's garden was on the top terrace, which was parallel to the Italyansky lane.  At one point, the top terrace accommodated rows of long wooden benches, designed to seat 200–300 spectators. In 1928, the benches were fenced off with shields (?)from the dicta(authorities?) and then completely was built a wooden fence. 

The hostel of the Pedagogical Institute is now located on the upper terrace.
On the lower terrace there are now cafes, a restaurant, a fountain, bushes, graveled paths.

References

Tourist attractions in Taganrog
Gardens in Russia